Monoprix S.A. is a major French retail chain with its headquarters in Clichy, Hauts-de-Seine, France, near Paris. The company's stores combine food retailing with fashion, beauty and home products.

History
The company was founded in 1932 in Rouen by Max Heilbronn, a son-in-law of Theophile Bader, the founder of Galeries Lafayette.

In 1991, Monoprix acquired the Uniprix brand after Galeries Lafayette took over Nouvelles Galeries, the parent of Uniprix.

In 1997, the chain merged with French retailer Prisunic, in a deal that saw Casino Group acquire a 21% stake in the merged company.

In 2000, Galeries Lafayette, entered into an agreement to sell a 50% interest in Monoprix. Casino Group provided Galeries Lafayette with a put option to sell the remaining 50%. In 2012, after legal wrangling over the value of the put option, the shareholders of both firms agreed on a sale price of $1.6 billion (€1.2 billion).  The , France's competition regulatory body, approved the transaction in 2013, with the condition that the merged group sell 58 stores. This allowed the deal to close, making Monoprix a wholly-owned subsidiary of Casino Group.

Monoprix has more than 700 shops in total: most under the Monoprix brand, but also smaller Monop', Monop' Daily, Monop' Station, Monop' Beauty, and Naturalia formats. It has a presence in over 250 towns and cities in France and employs around 21,000 people.

See also

References

External links
 monoprix.fr  

Groupe Casino
Supermarkets of France
Retail companies established in 1932
French brands
French companies established in 1932